Kjell Hjertsson (1 August 1922 – 8 February 2013) was a Swedish footballer who played his entire career at Malmö FF as a midfielder.

His brothers Arne Hjertsson and Sven Hjertsson were also footballers.
He died 8 February 2013.

References

External links

1922 births
2013 deaths
Association football midfielders
Swedish footballers
Allsvenskan players
Malmö FF players
Sweden international footballers